Marianne W. Lewis is an American academic and since 2019 the dean for Carl H. Lindner College of Business (Lindner College of Business) at the University of Cincinnati. She was previously the dean of the Cass Business School in London, England.

Lewis was born to Steven C. Wheelwright and Margaret Steele.  Her father is an academic who served as senior associate dean at the Harvard Business School and later as president of Brigham Young University–Hawaii from 2007 to 2015.

Lewis graduated from Tusculum College in 1989. She received a master of business administration from the Kelley School of Business at Indiana University in 1991. She went on to receive a PhD in Management from the Gatton College of Business and Economics at the University of Kentucky in 1997. Her thesis was entitled Advanced Manufacturing Technology Design: A Multiparadigm Study.

Career
Lewis became a Professor of Management at Lindner College of Business in 1996. She served as its associate dean until May 2015.

Lewis was a visiting fellow at Keele University in 2000 and a Fulbright Scholar at Cardiff University in 2014. She is a member of the Society for Industrial and Organizational Psychology. She serves on the Advisory Board of the Future Business Journal. She is a recipient of the 2007 Best Paper Award from the Academy of Management Review for her article entitled, Exploring Paradox: Toward a More Comprehensive Guide.

Lewis served as the Dean of the Cass Business School in London from 2015 to 2019. Lewis is the first woman to lead the renowned Lindner College of Business.

Personal life
Lewis has 3 children, 2 sons and 1 daughter.

Publications

References

External links
 Dean Marianne W. Lewis Official profile

Living people
Tusculum University alumni
Kelley School of Business alumni
University of Kentucky alumni
University of Cincinnati faculty
Academics of Keele University
People associated with Bayes Business School
Business school deans
Women deans (academic)
Kentucky women in education
American expatriates in England
Year of birth missing (living people)
American women academics
21st-century American women